Awesome Mausam is a 2016 Bollywood movie is directed by Yogesh Bhardwaj and Produced by Mukesh Choudhary. The film features Rahul Romy Sharma, Naina Ganguly(Ambalika Sarkar), Mukesh Tiwari, Suunil R Kumar, Raja Mishra and Suhasini Mulay.

Plot
This love story between a Hindu boy, Rahul Sharma (Rahul Romy Sharma) and Muslim girl, Ghazal Siddiqui (Ambalika Sarkar) invokes the ‘Laila-Majnu’ track to drive home its legendary leanings. Unfortunately there’s really nothing much to recommend here save for a few lines of stinging thought-provoking dialogue.

Rahul and Ghazal perform the Laila-Majnu play in their college and eventually fall in love. But the girl’s uneducated, successful land shark, father, Siddiqui (Mukesh Tiwari) is livid about the pairing and puts up hurdles in their way. An NGO, basically a website tiled ‘Love Guard,’ started by Arjun (Manmohan tiwari) – a love-loss survivor, hopes to help and protect such couples achieve happily ever after. Suunil R Kumar played and important role as a friend of Rahul in the college premises till tragedy happens with him. A comedy scene has been performed by "Raja Mishra" with the catch phrase "got it" to lighten the mood of the audience.  Rahul and Ghazal seek out his help but will that be enough to withstand the entire onslaught that Siddiqui has in store for them?

This film delivers its plea for Hindu-Muslim amity without much finesse or interest, it has all been done before and love stories of this nature and bent have become stale and passé. The lead performers are also not significantly worthy.

Cast
 Rahul Sharma
 Naina Ganguly
 Mukesh Tiwari
 Manmohan Tiwari
 Suhasini Mulay
 Vaarssh Bhatnagar
 Lalitesh Jha
 Prince Sondhi
 Manmohan Tiwari
 Shikha Itkan
 Suunil R Kumar
 Raja Mishra

Soundtrack

The music for Awesome Mausam has been composed by Javed Ali, Ishan Ghosh, Komal Aran Atariya The music rights have been acquired by T-Series. The album contains total 6 tracks.

References

External links
 

2016 films
2010s Hindi-language films